"That's a Plan" is a song recorded by the American country music artist Mark McGuinn. It was released in June 2001 as the second single from the album Mark McGuinn. The song reached No. 25 on the Billboard Hot Country Singles & Tracks chart. The song was written by Bobby Boyd and David Leone.

Chart performance

References

2001 singles
2001 songs
Mark McGuinn songs
Songs written by Bobby Boyd (songwriter)